The Stone Age is a 1931 short animated film by Walter Lantz Productions, and one of many featuring Oswald the Lucky Rabbit.

Plot
Everybody is a caveman. But while they wear animal hide, they also wear shoes that are rather modern day in style.

Oswald is riding outdoors on a wooden scooter, looking for a girl to date with. He then comes to a house with an escalator resembling a dinosaur with fins. Coming down to him is a girl kitty in high heeled pumps. While they walk together for a few seconds, a big bear sneaks from beside, and pounds the girl kitty in the head with a club. But instead of lying unconscious, the kitty falls in love with the bear who takes her away. Oswald is quite surprised.

Oswald learns that a girl would adore a guy who bashes her in the head. He then goes around some more to find another date. When Oswald attempts to pound someone, another guy tricks him not to do so, and therefore uses the trick to pound and win that girl. In another attempt, Oswald manages to pound a lady to adoring him, only to find her unattractive. Oswald then heads to some fair grounds where a high striker is being featured.

Oswald comes to the machine to test his strength. After two failed tries, he sees the bear and the kitty come by. When the bear decides to play the machine, Oswald ties a string between the rock on the game's lever and the bear's foot. And as the bear strikes the other end of the lever, that mustelid ends up hitting the bell head first before going fainted. Oswald then pounds the girl kitty in the head with the game's mallet. The kitty reverts to her affection for Oswald.

References

External links
The Stone Age at the Big Cartoon Database
The Walter Lantz Cartune Encyclopedia: 1931
 

1931 films
1931 animated films
1931 short films
1930s American animated films
1930s animated short films
American black-and-white films
Films directed by Walter Lantz
Oswald the Lucky Rabbit cartoons
Universal Pictures short films
Walter Lantz Productions shorts
Animated films set in prehistory
Prehistoric life in popular culture
Universal Pictures animated short films
Animated films about animals
Films about cavemen